Fariz Musa (1 March 1970 – 27 December 2021) was a Malaysian politician. He was the Coordinator of the movement called Jingga 13, and served as National Deputy Chief and Terengganu State Chief of Angkatan Muda Keadilan (AMK), the youth wing in People's Justice Party (PKR), a component of Pakatan Harapan (PH) coalition.

Career
Musa contested the 2008 General Election in the parliamentary seat of Kemaman, Terengganu but lost to the United Malays National Organisation (UMNO) candidate Ahmad Shabery Cheek.

In the 2013 General Election, Musa was selected by the de facto PKR leader, Anwar Ibrahim, to contest against the Prime Minister of Malaysia, Najib Razak, in the Pekan, Pahang parliamentary seat. He was defeated 51,278 to 15,665 (75.2% to 23.0%) on a voter turnout of 85.0%.

Controversy
Musa was said to have attacked the Democratic Action Party (DAP) leadership as they were disowning the status quo in setting up candidates for the 13th General Election. He said that DAP do not understand the terms and condition of their Pakatan Rakyat (PR) union to capture the Putrajaya. This caused a dispute between the Pahang PKR and the Pahang DAP.

Personal life and death
Musa was a native of Terengganu. He died from COVID-19 on 27 December 2021, at the age of 51.

Election results

References

1970 births
2021 deaths
21st-century Malaysian politicians
Deaths from the COVID-19 pandemic in Malaysia
Malaysian Muslims
Malaysian people of Malay descent
People from Terengganu
People's Justice Party (Malaysia) politicians